Athanasios "Alkis" Kynigakis (born 21 August 1998) is a Greek marathon swimmer. In the 2020 Summer Olympics he took the fifth place at the event 10 km open water, with a time of 1:49:29.

References

1998 births
Living people
Greek male swimmers
Olympic swimmers of Greece
Swimmers at the 2020 Summer Olympics